Pitambar Paswan  is an Indian politician. He was elected to the Lok Sabha, the lower house of the Parliament of India from the Rosera in Bihar as a member of the Rashtriya Janata Dal.

References

External links
Official biographical sketch in Parliament of India website

1950 births
Rashtriya Janata Dal politicians
India MPs 1991–1996
Living people
Janata Dal politicians